Stonebridge Park Depot was also the historic name for part of Wembley Intercity Depot

Stonebridge Park Depot is a stabling and maintenance depot for trains on the Bakerloo line of the London Underground in England. It opened in 1979, as part of the restructuring that resulted in the Bakerloo line's Stanmore branch becoming part of the Jubilee line. It is the main depot on the Bakerloo line, and has been used for stabling stock dating from 1938, 1959 and 1972. In addition, trains of 1972 Stock from the Northern line have been transferred to the depot temporarily for overhaul.

History
The Bakerloo line opened from Baker Street to Lambeth North in 1906, and trains were stabled and maintained at London Road Depot. This had been built on the site of a school for the Indigent Blind, and was accessed by a  branch, leaving the running tunnels between Waterloo and Lambeth North stations. The line was extended to Elephant and Castle at the southern end, while at the northern end, it reached Queen's Park on 11 February 1915. A branch from Baker Street to Finchley Road was opened on 20 November 1939, and services were extended along the Metropolitan line tracks to terminate at Stanmore. Neasden Depot became the centre for maintenance of the trains, and London Road was downgraded to becoming stabling sidings.

When plans were made to split the two northern branches of the Bakerloo, with the Stanmore branch becoming part of the Jubilee line, it became necessary to provide new stabling and maintenance facilities for the truncated Bakerloo line, and a new depot was built at Stonebridge Park, which opened in 1979. This is located just to the north-west of Stonebridge Park station, and has two main sheds. Tracks 31 to 38 are furthest west, and are equipped with pits between the rails. The second building covers tracks 39 to 44, and is further east. There are three open air sidings, numbered 45 to 47, two of which were added around 1989. In 2002, 12 trains were normally stabled at the depot.

Operation

Prior to the Stanmore branch becoming part of the Jubilee line, the Bakerloo line had been operated by a mix of 1938 Stock and 1972 Mark II Stock. The 1972 Stock had been transferred to the line from late 1976 onwards, and the first train entered passenger service on 4 April 1977. When the split occurred, all of the 1972 Stock was used to operate the Jubilee line, and Stonebridge Park depot held a full complement of 1938 Stock. A temporary decrease in passenger numbers on the underground generally saw service reductions introduced from December 1982, and spare trains of 1959 Stock were transferred to the Bakerloo. The first train arrived at the depot on 5 December 1982, to allow crews to be trained, and the units entered service on 28 February 1983. By 3 October 1983, 15 trains had been transferred, and 14 trains of 1938 Stock had been withdrawn for scrapping. When delivery of 1983 Stock began, to re-equip the Jubilee line, 1972 Stock was moved to the Northern line, and displaced 1959 Stock was transferred to the Bakerloo. All 1938 Stock had left the depot and the line by 20 November 1985.

From early 1987 onwards, the depot saw regular visits of 1972 Mark 1 Stock, which were transferred from the Northern line for overhaul. A second batch of 1983 Stock was ordered for the Jubilee line, allowing 1972 Mark II Stock to be transferred to the Bakerloo and Stonebridge Park depot, and this transfer was completed by March 1989. Unusually, the trains are turned to run on the Bakerloo, with the 'A' end facing south and the 'D' end facing north. This allows shunting within the depot to be carried out from a middle driving motor car of a four-car unit, rather than from the shunting cabinet on an uncoupling non-driving motor car of a three-car unit. The 33 trains of 1972 Mark II Stock were supplemented by a modified train of 1972 Mark I Stock in 1989, which was renumbered to follow the numbering sequence of those already on the Bakerloo. It is unclear where they were all stored, since Hardy in 1993 lists the 34 trains under stock allocation but only accounts for 28 under depot allocation, ten at Stonebridge Park depot, seven at Queen's Park depot, nine at London Road depot, and two on sidings at Elephant and Castle. A similar anomaly occurs in 2002, when he lists 36 trains but only 32 in the depot allocation. By this time, 12 trains were stabled at Stonebridge Park depot, seven at Queen's Park depot, ten at London Road, now downgraded to sidings, and three at Elephant and Castle.

References

Bibliography

Railway depots in London
London Underground depots
Transport in the London Borough of Brent